Hibbertia synandra is a species of flowering plant in the family Dilleniaceae and is endemic to Queensland. It was first formally described in 1864 by Ferdinand von Mueller in Fragmenta Phytographiae Australiae from specimens collected near Rockingham Bay by John Dallachy.

See also
List of Hibbertia species

References

synandra
Flora of Queensland
Plants described in 1864
Taxa named by Ferdinand von Mueller